Hollywood Without Make-Up is a 1963 American film produced by Ken Murray and directed by Rudy Behlmer, Loring d'Usseau and Ken Murray (uncredited).

Plot
The film consists of archive footage of famous Hollywood stars, mostly home movies by Ken Murray, showing the stars as themselves instead of playing a role in front of the camera. William Randolph Hearst and his family are shown at Hearst Castle, including its zoo that included many species of wild animals. The filmmakers' daughters went on set with Walt Disney for the shooting of a film. Tom Mix can be seen driving the 1937 Cord 812 Phaeton in which he was killed just two weeks later in Arizona. Candid images are included, such as those of Mary Pickford, Lucille Ball and Rory Calhoun. The film ends with images of Marilyn Monroe.

Cast
Ken Murray as himself / narrator

The film contains archival footage of:

References

External links
 
 
 
 

1963 films
Documentary films about Hollywood, Los Angeles
1960s English-language films
American documentary films
1960s American films